The Honourable Thomas Francis Wenman FRS (18 November 1745 – 8 April 1796) was a British professor, natural historian, and antiquarian.

Wenman was the second son of Philip Wenman, 6th Viscount Wenman and his wife Sophia, daughter and co-heiress of James Herbert of Tythorpe. He was born at Thame Park, near Thame, Oxfordshire in 1745. He was educated at University College, Oxford, matriculating on 22 October 1762. On 12 May 1764, he was admitted to the Inner Temple as a student.

In 1765, while studying law, he was elected a fellow of All Souls College, Oxford, and in 1770, he was called to the bar. He received degrees in civil law from Oxford as well, becoming a BCL in 1771 and a DCL in 1780. Wenman unsuccessfully contested Wallingford in 1774, but was returned for Westbury, and sat in the House of Commons for the constituency until 1780.

Wenman was elected a Fellow of the Royal Society on 21 January 1779. Perhaps due to his antiquarian propensities, he was elected Keeper of the Archives of Oxford University on 15 January 1781, and was made deputy steward of the University in December.

In 1789, he was appointed Regius Professor of Civil Law in succession to Robert Vansittart, but his real interest lay in natural history and botany. While collecting specimens, he fell into the River Cherwell, near Water Eaton, and was drowned on 8 April 1796. He was buried in the chapel of All Souls on 15 April 1796.

References

1745 births
1796 deaths
People from Thame
Younger sons of viscounts
Alumni of University College, Oxford
British legal scholars
British MPs 1774–1780
English barristers
18th-century British botanists
Fellows of All Souls College, Oxford
Fellows of the Royal Society
Members of the Inner Temple
Members of the Parliament of Great Britain for English constituencies
Regius Professors of Civil Law (University of Oxford)
Accidental deaths in England
Deaths by drowning in the United Kingdom
Keepers of the Archives of the University of Oxford